On October 26, 2001, 25-year-old nursing assistant Chante Jawan Mallard murdered 37-year-old Gregory Glenn Biggs, a homeless man, with her automobile, in Fort Worth, Texas, U.S. The force of the crash lodged Biggs into the windshield. Mallard then drove home and left the man lodged in the windshield of her car, parked in her garage. He died a day or two later. Mallard was convicted and sentenced to 50 years' imprisonment for her role in his death but will be eligible for parole in 2027.

Victim
Gregory Glenn Biggs, born August 16, 1964. Although he lived with mental health problems all his adult life, he took good care of his son and held a job in construction as a mason. At the moment of the events, Biggs was living in a state of homelessness, but was "on an upswing", according to his mother.

Murder
Chante Jawan Mallard (born June 22, 1976) is a woman from Fort Worth, Texas. On October 26, 2001, Mallard's Chevrolet Cavalier struck the homeless pedestrian Gregory Glenn Biggs; at the time Mallard was believed to have been driving while intoxicated by a combination of marijuana, ecstasy and alcohol. The force of the impact sent Biggs flying through the windshield, lodging him there.

Mallard then drove home, leaving the injured Biggs stuck in her windshield, and parked her car in her garage.
After the accident, Mallard did not notify the police nor did she get Biggs any medical attention, even though she was a nursing assistant at the time. Occasionally, she would return to the garage to check on his status. When Biggs died a day or two later, still in the windshield of her car in her garage, she called a male friend, Clete Jackson, for assistance. Mallard, Jackson, and Jackson's cousin Herbert Tyrone Cleveland took the body to a park and left it there, even going so far as to set fire to part of the car in an attempt to disguise the evidence. The three were later each convicted on charges of tampering with evidence for this action.

Mallard became a suspect after she was reported talking and laughing about the incident at a party some four months after the events. "I hit this white man", Mallard allegedly told acquaintance Maranda Daniel, while laughing.

Trial
Mallard's trial commenced on June 23, 2003. During the trial, Tarrant County medical examiner Nizam Peerwani testified that, had Mallard taken Biggs to a hospital, he would have recovered from his injuries. Other experts testified that they agreed that Biggs would have survived. "There's not a member of the Fort Worth Fire Department that could not have saved Mr. Biggs's life", testified Capt. Jim Sowder. Mallard was convicted of murder in June 2003, with the 50-year murder sentence and 10-year tampering sentence to run concurrently. She will be eligible for parole in 2027.

Aftermath
A wrongful death lawsuit filed by Biggs's son, Brandon, was settled out of court. He later chose to forgive Ms. Mallard and the others involved in his father's murder. "I want to extend my forgiveness to Chante Mallard and let her know that the Mallard family is in my prayers", he said in 2003. In response, convicted murderers from around the country raised $10,000 as a college scholarship and had it presented at a ceremony to Mr. Biggs, who at the time was a 20-year-old pastoral ministry sophomore at Southwestern Assemblies of God University in Waxahachie, Texas.

Since finishing his sentence, Clete Denel Jackson, who was imprisoned for helping move Biggs's body, has been in and out of prison on firearms- and drug-related charges. He was set to be released again in late November 2017. Mallard's relationship with Jackson and Cleveland remains unclear. Jackson's lawyer described his client and Mallard as linked romantically. Yet relatives of Jackson and Cleveland claim they had never heard of Mallard.

Media adaptations
Mallard's case was later adapted as an episode of the CSI: Crime Scene Investigation ("Anatomy of a Lye", aired May 2, 2002) and also as an episode of Law & Order ("Darwinian", aired January 7, 2004) – although the female driver is here a white high-profile publicist (a conflation with the real-life case of Lizzie Grubman) who is allowed to plead guilty to obstruction of justice after an autopsy reveals that the accident was not the cause of the fatal head injury.

The story inspired events in the second season of Fargo, in which Peggy Blumquist (Kirsten Dunst) hits Rye Gerhardt (Kieran Culkin) and drives back home with him stuck through the windshield.

This story also inspired a scene in the third season of the FOX procedural drama 9-1-1 when Stella (Stephanie Lemelin) hits a homeless man after crashing into him with her car. The man is also lodged in the windshield of her car by the impact. Stella suffers a head injury in the crash and drives around town with the man still stuck in her windshield for nearly two days before firefighter Evan Buckley (Oliver Stark) stops her. Unlike the real-life incident, the man on the show survives his injuries after being rushed to the hospital.

Films inspired by the events include Stuck (2007, with Mena Suvari and Stephen Rea), Hit and Run (2009, with Laura Breckenridge), and Accident on Hill Road (2009, with Celina Jaitley and Farooque Shaikh).

See also
 List of unusual deaths

References

External links
 Smoking Gun Arrest Warrant Affidavit of Detective D.E. Owings.

2001 in Texas
Deaths by person in Texas
History of Fort Worth, Texas
2003 in Texas
2001 murders in the United States
Murder in Texas
Homelessness in the United States
October 2001 events in the United States
Driving under the influence
2002 in Texas
October 2001 crimes